Under Gail Succubus is the twentieth studio album by Severed Heads, twelfth if you don't count the Op and Music Server series of albums. Released in 2006, the double disc recording was released in two editions: The standard edition, packaged in a DVD case with transparent artwork, and the metal box edition, which was packaged in a tin box. Ellard later expressed regret for the metal box edition, for it would usually come in damaged in some way during mail order delivery. The album itself is a double disc set, the second disc, sometimes referred to as Over Barbara Island, would later be issued as its own separate album on iTunes.

Track listing

References

External links
 
 Bandcamp page

Severed Heads albums
2006 albums